Scrap Metal were a band from Broome, Western Australia who played rock music with elements of country and reggae. The members had Aboriginal, Irish, Filipino, French, Chinese, Scottish, Indonesian and Japanese heritage.

The band toured nationally as part of the Bran Nue Dae musical and with Midnight Oil, and were the first Aboriginal band to sign an international publishing deal. An ABC TV documentary From Broome to the Big Smoke was made about them. Scrap Metal won the 'Best Indigenous Act' award at the 1992 West Australian Music Industry Awards.

After Scrap Metal Alan, Stephen and Phillip Pigram joined up with their brothers David, Colin, Gavin and Peter to create The Pigram Brothers.

In 2006 Stephen and Alan Pigram were inducted into the Western Australian Music Hall of Fame.

Discography

Albums
 Just Looking (1987)
 Broken Down Man (1988) – Jigil Records
 Scrap Metal (1990) – ABC Records
 Pub Sweat 'n' Tears (1992) – Jigil Records

Singles
 "Somewhere in the Distance / Magdalene" (1988)
 "Broken Down Man" / "Caught in the Wheel" (1988)
 "Nimunburr" / "In the Night" (1989)
 "Make It Work" (1990)
 "Howling at the Moon" (1991)

References

External links
[ Scrap Metal at allmusic]

Western Australian musical groups
Indigenous Australian musical groups
Musical groups established in 1983
Musical groups disestablished in 1995